City of Beautiful Nonsense is a 1919 British silent film drama directed by Henry Edwards, who also starred in the film with Chrissie White.  The film is based on the best-selling 1909 novel of the same name by E. Temple Thurston and is a tale of a woman intending to marry for financial gain and security, who realises at the last minute that to be true to herself and to have the prospect of a happy future she must instead marry for love.  A sound version of the same story was made in 1935 by Adrian Brunel.

The film appears to have been well received and popular with audiences and has been described as "the most talked about British film of 1919" and "technically on a par with the current Hollywood imports".  A contemporary review in The Bioscope admired Edwards' "poetic embellishments" and "symbolistic touches".

Cast
 Henry Edwards as John Grey
 Chrissie White as Jill Dealtry
 Henry Vibart as Thomas Grey
 Gwynne Herbert as Mrs. Grey
 James Lindsay as Skipworth
 Douglas Munro as Chesterton
 Stephen Ewart as Mr. Dealtry
 Teddy Taylor as Tommy Dealtry

References

External links 
 
 City of Beautiful Nonsense at BFI Film& TV Database

1919 films
1919 drama films
British silent feature films
British drama films
Films directed by Henry Edwards
British black-and-white films
Films based on Irish novels
Hepworth Pictures films
1919 lost films
Lost drama films
1910s British films
Silent drama films
1910s English-language films
English-language drama films